Alomyini is a tribe of ichneumon wasps in the family Ichneumonidae. There are two genera in Alomyini.

Genera
These two genera belong to the tribe Alomyini:
 Alomya Panzer, 1806
 Megalomya Uchida, 1940

References

Ichneumoninae
Hymenoptera tribes